Swimming is one of the sports at the quadrennial Commonwealth Games competition. It has been a Commonwealth Games sport since the inaugural edition of the event's precursor, the 1930 British Empire Games. It is a core sport and must be included in the sporting programme of each edition of the Games. Synchronised swimming and Diving events are optional. Water polo is a recognised (i.e. not yet optional) sport.

Editions

Events

Men's events

Women's events

Elite Athletes with a Disability events
From the 2002 Commonwealth Games a number of events have been included in the program to include elite athletes with disabilities. The inclusion of events in this category has been inconsistent over the four Games where they have been included.

All-time medal table

Updated after the 2022 Commonwealth Games

Games records

External links
Commonwealth Games sport index

 
Swimming
Commonwealth Games